Bachelor's Affairs  also known as Fancy Free is a 1932 American Pre-Code film based on the play "Precious" by James Forbes. While its availability for viewing is currently limited, it has been preserved by the UCLA Film and Television Archive.

References

External links
 

American comedy films
1932 films
1932 comedy films
American black-and-white films
Fox Film films
1930s American films